The following is a list of German artists nominated for MTV Europe Music Awards. List does not include MTV Europe Music Award for Best German Act, New Sounds of Europe or MTV Europe Music Award for Best European Act. Winners are in bold text.

MTV Europe Music Awards